Samuel Joseph (born 1937), better known as Shyam, is a music composer who works in Malayalam cinema.

From the mid-1970s to the late 1980s, Shyam had a prolific run as a composer in the Malayalam film industry, composing for nearly 200 films. Working with all major directors of the time, Shyam had scored for many hits of Jayan and the early films of Mammootty and Mohanlal.

Career beginnings
Shyam apprenticed under maestros M. S. Viswanathan and Salil Chowdhury, the former renaming him 'Shyam'. He has been an assistant for various music directors including Salil Chowdhury, Rajan Nagendra, Satyam, S. Rajeswara Rao, Pendyala Nageswara Rao, AM Raja, TG Lingappa etc for several years before venturing as an independent music director. He has also worked as a lead violinist with famous composers like C. Ramachandra, V Dakshinamoorthi, Naushad, Madan Mohan, G. Devarajan, Bombay Ravi, RD Burman etc.

Along with his training in western violin he is also trained in carnatic classical violin under the baton of legendary classical violinist Lalgudi Jayaraman.

He debuted as an independent film composer in Malayalam cinema through the 1974 film, Manyasree Viswamithran directed by actor Madhu. All the tracks from the movie including Kettille Kottayathoru became huge success.

Partial filmography
Malayalam
Manyasree Viswamithran (1974)
Saritha (1977)
Abhinivesham (1977)
Kalliyankattu Neeli (1979)
Angaadi(1980)
Thrishna(1981)
Enthino Pookunna Pookkal (1982)
Mazhu (1982)
Engane Nee Marakkum (1983)
America America (1983 film) (1983)
Aksharangal (1984)
Kanamarayathu (1984)
Nirakkoottu (1985)
Gandhinagar 2nd Street (1986)
Aavanazhi (1986)
Malarum Kiliyum (1986)
New Delhi (1987)
Nadodikattu (1987)
Oru CBI Diary Kurippu (1988)
Daisy (1988)
Moonnam Mura (1988)
Jagratha (1989)
Adhipan (1989)
Adikkurippu (1989)
Naduvazhikal (1989)
Kottayam Kunjachan (1990)
Randam Varavu (1990)
Arhatha (1990)
Inspector Balram (1991)
Anubhoothi (1997)
Sethurama Iyer CBI (2004)
Nerariyan CBI (2005)
Tamil
Karunthel Kannayiram (1972)
Manidharil Ithanai Nirangala! (1978)
Devadhai (1979)
Pancha Kalyani (1979)
Sree Devi (1980)
Matravai Neril (1981)
Kal vadiyum Pookkal (1981)
Salanam (1981)
Punitha Malar (1982)
Vaa Indha Pakkam (1981)
Kuppathu Ponnu (1983)
Nandri Meendum varuga (1983)
Andhi Mayakkam (1984)
Oru Pullankuzhal Aduppu Oodhugiradhu (1984)
Kuzhandhai Yesu (1984)
Vilangu meen (1987)
 Vilangu
Jaathi Pookkal (1987)
Poo Mazhai Pozhiyuthu (1987) (score only)
 Oonjal
 Nee Sirithaal Naan Sirippen
 Velaikkari Vijaya
 iniyavale vaa
 Kanneril Ezhuthathe
 Paasam oru Vesam
 Kuyile Kuyile
Appa Amma (1974)
Alli Durbar (1978)
Unarchigal (1976)
Naan Nandri Solven
Thevaigal
Ithu Kathai Alla
Kunguma Kolangal
Akkaraiku Vaaringala
Idhayam Pesugirathu
Kaladi Osai
Nalam Nalamariya Aaval
Santhosha Kanavugal
Antha Vaanam Saatchi
Sariyana Jodi
Other languages
Antima Teerpu (1988; Telugu)
New Delhi (1988; Hindi)
New Delhi (1988; Kannada)
 God Father (Kannada)

Hit Songs

Awards 
Kerala State Film Awards:

 Best Music Director – 1983 – Aaroodam
 Best Music Director – 1984 – Kanamarayathu

References 

  Mark of the master composer, musician, The Hindu
  Play it again, Shyam, The Hindu]*Shyam the King of 80's (orkut community)
 http://devaragam.com/vbscript/musicNew.aspx?artistid=51
 Shyam at MSI

1937 births
Living people
Tamil film score composers
Kerala State Film Award winners
Malayalam film score composers
Musicians from Chennai
20th-century Indian composers